Fredman's Epistles is a collection of 82 songs by the dominant figure in Swedish 18th century song, Carl Michael Bellman, first published in 1790. It was created over a period of twenty years from 1768 onwards. A companion volume, Fredmans sånger (Fredman's Songs) was published the following year.

The songs in Fredman's Epistles vary widely in style and effect, from Rococo-themed pastorale with a cast of gods and demigods from classical antiquity to laments for the effects of Brännvin-drinking; lively tavern-scenes, apparent improvisations skilfully crafted. The lyrics describe a gallery of fictional and semi-fictional characters and events taking place in Stockholm of that era, based on the lives of actual people Bellman was aware of. Jean Fredman, an alcoholic former watchmaker, is the central character and fictional narrator. Ulla Winblad, based on one of Bellman's friends, is the chief of the fictional "nymphs", half goddess, half prostitute, of the demimonde characters of Fredman's Epistles. Many of the songs have remained culturally significant in Scandinavia, especially in Sweden.

They are widely sung and recorded, by amateur choirs and professional singers alike. The Orphei Drängar are a choir named for a phrase in Epistle 14, and set up to perform Bellman's works; they give concerts around the world. Several professional solo singers in the Swedish ballad tradition largely made their name in the 1960s singing Bellman, while accompanying themselves in Bellmanesque style with a guitar. They were the members of the "Storks" artistic community ("Vispråmen Storken") in Stockholm, and they include Fred Åkerström (1937–1985) with his albums Fred sjunger Bellman, Glimmande nymf and Vila vid denna källa, and Cornelis Vreeswijk with his albums Spring mot Ulla, spring! and Movitz! Movitz!. Other singers such as Sven-Bertil Taube and William Clauson used the less authentic accompaniment of an ensemble; Clauson was also the first to release a recording of Bellman in English, alongside his Swedish recordings. 
Singers from other traditions sometimes sing Bellman; for example, the folk singer Sofia Karlsson and the popular musician Cajsa Grytt. Over 500 recordings of Bellman's Fredman's Epistles or Fredman's Songs have been placed on YouTube.

Among the best known of Fredman's Epistles are: No. 2, Nå skruva Fiolen, No. 3, Fader Berg i hornet stöter, No. 7, Fram med basfiolen, knäpp och skruva, No. 12, Gråt Fader Berg och spela, No. 23, Ach du min Moder!, described as "the to-be-or-not-to-be of Swedish literature"; No. 28, I går såg jag ditt barn, min Fröja, No. 33, Stolta Stad!, No. 35, Bröderna fara väl vilse ibland; No. 36, Vår Ulla låg i sängen och sov, a poem of "immeasurable artistry, balance, and subtlety of effect"; No. 40, Ge rum i Bröllops-gåln din hund!, "one of the wildest weddings in Swedish literature"; No. 48, Solen glimmar blank och trind; No. 63, Fader Bergström; No. 71, Ulla! min Ulla! säj får jag dig bjuda; No. 72, Glimmande nymf; No. 80, Liksom en Herdinna, högtids klädd;  No. 81, Märk hur vår skugga; and No. 82, the last, Hvila vid denna källa.

List of Fredman's Epistles

Each of the 82 epistles is listed here with its number and its original descriptive title or dedication. The contemporary Gustavian age cast of characters is listed under "Mortals"; the classical and Nordic gods and demigods (and in one Epistle, a cast of Old Testament heroes) are listed under "Immortals".

References

Sources

 
 
 
 
  (contains the most popular Epistles and Songs, in Swedish, with sheet music)
  (contains the most popular Epistles and Songs, in Swedish, with sheet music)
  (with facsimiles of sheet music from first editions in 1790, 1791)

External links

 Bellman lyrics and reference index Bellman.net 

Swedish poetry
1790 books
Works by Carl Michael Bellman
Fredmans epistlar